Khazz silk (al-khazz الخزّ ) was a blended silk cloth made of silk and wool. The Persian qazz or Arabic khazz, refers to silk or silk products. In medieval Arabic القزّ al-qazz meant "silk".

History 
Khazz silk is an olden variety of silken cloths. Khazz was a fabric of the 13th century, and the same cloth is mentioned in the  16th-century document  Ain-i-Akbari. There are mentions in the Arabic literature about a type of striped khazz and Kutuf (the velvet cloth) used at the Umayyad Caliphate court, Hisham ibn Abd al-Malik (691-743).
Hisham used to have a fondness for robes and carpets." …. In his days there were made, striped silk (al-khazz rakm) and velvets (kutuf)".''

Texture 
The texture of Khazz was similar to velvet or a napped cloth.

Price 
Khazz is noted as one of the costlier stuff, and It was priced at 16 Tankahs/silver coins (equal to the monthly salary of a soldier in the 14th century). The price is almost 16 times corresponding to a long cloth which was 1 Tankah

See also 
 Silk
 Katan (cloth)

References 

Silk
Textiles